Neves is a town on the north west coast of São Tomé Island in São Tomé and Príncipe. It is the seat of the Lembá District. Its population is 10,068 (2012). The main subdivisions of Neves are Benga, Rosema, Água Tomá, Bom Sucesso and Praia de Ponta Figo. It is the site of a deep-water port that was jointly constructed with Nigeria.  Neves is home to some of the few industrial facilities on the island, such as a brewery and a power plant fueled by natural gas and solar energy. The plant was built by a consortium from Angola in 2014. It is capable of producing 30 megawatts of gas power and an additional 5 megawatts of solar power.

As part of a Joint Development Zone between the two countries, São Tomé and Príncipe and Nigeria agreed in 2012 to construct a fuel port in Neves. The port was jointly organized by the two countries as part of the agreement. Funding was provided by the Nigerian government and by the Joint Development Authority Investment. Nigeria also provided the processing contract to construct the port. In return, the government of São Tomé and Príncipe provided the land used in construction and granted a tax holiday to the project's investors.

Population history

Sports
Neves is home to football club FC Neves, which plays in the São Tomé and Príncipe Championship, the top division of football in the country.

International relations
The Portuguese city of Porto has been a sister city of Neves since 1987.

References

Populated places in Lembá District
Populated coastal places in São Tomé and Príncipe